Johan Östling, née Andersson was born 27 September 1973 om Karlstad, Sweden. He is a Swedish actor and musician. He was a member of the music group The Starboys. However, he left in 2013. Östling is known for his work on Natan (2003), Slim Susie (2003) and God Save the King (2005). He has acted in films such as Smala Sussie and Bröllopsfotografen, and in TV-shows such as Ack Värmland which is broadcast on TV4.

References

External links 

Living people
1973 births
Swedish male actors
Swedish male musicians
People from Karlstad
20th-century Swedish people